The Ghanaian records in swimming are the fastest ever performances of swimmers from Ghana, which are recognised and ratified by the Ghana Swimming Association.

All records were set in finals unless noted otherwise.

Long Course (50 m)

Men

Women

Mixed relay

Short Course (25 m)

Men

Women

References

Ghana
Records
Swimming